Rita, Sue and Bob Too is a 1987 British comedy-drama film directed by Alan Clarke, set in Bradford, West Yorkshire about two teenaged schoolgirls who have a sexual fling with a married man. It was adapted by Andrea Dunbar, based on two of her stage plays; Rita Sue and Bob Too (1982) and The Arbour (1980), which was first performed at the Royal Court Theatre, London. The strapline of the film was: "Thatcher's Britain with her knickers down."

Plot
Rita and Sue are two teenage girls in their final year of school who live on a run down council estate in Bradford. To earn some money, they babysit for Bob and Michelle, a better-off couple who live in a detached house in a nicer part of town. When the couple return later, Michelle pays the girls and tells Bob to give them a lift home. Bob, however, drives them to an out of the way place and proposes to have sex with each of them in the back of his car. They nonchalantly agree, and he and the girls plan to make it a regular thing. By the time they're finished, it's 2:00 a.m.

Sue gets a part-time job at a local taxi firm, and meets Aslam, a Pakistani boy who drives for the firm. He and another driver make a bet on who can get her into bed first, but Sue rebuffs them. At school, Bob shows up at Rita and Sue's PE tennis class to take them for sex. Rita manages to get permission from the teacher to use the toilet (a ruse to see Bob) but Sue is denied and told to get back to the class. Bob takes Rita to a show house on a newly built housing development to have sex.

Later, Michelle finds a packet of condoms in Bob's trousers whilst ironing them and they argue. During the argument, it is revealed that Michelle does not like sex, which frustrates Bob. It also turns out that Bob previously had an affair, discovered when Michelle found another woman's bracelet in their bed; the other woman had also been their babysitter. Michelle goes upstairs to get ready for their planned night out, just as Rita and Sue arrive as they are again babysitting. Bob warns the girls that Michelle is suspicious and will ask them questions, but they convince Michelle that Bob isn't sleeping with either of them.

After their night out, Bob and Michelle start arguing again, this time in front of Rita and Sue who desperately try not to laugh. Michelle snaps at the girls, then storms off to bed. Rita and Sue make their own way home, unhappy that Bob can't take them in his car and have sex with them again. That night, Michelle decides to let Bob have sex with her to stop him going off with other women but it goes badly.

The next day, on a school trip, Sue gets into a fight with a classmate who calls her a "slag" because she is rumoured to be seeing a married man. Later, Rita and Sue meet Bob again for sex but Bob can't get an erection, embarrassing himself and leaving Rita and Sue unsatisfied. He takes them out to a club where Michelle's friend, Mavis, spots Bob with the girls. Bob warns the girls that Mavis will surely tell Michelle she saw them together.

The next day, Mavis rushes around to tell Michelle as expected, and Michelle gets Mavis to drive her to Rita's house. Michelle drags Rita out of her house and into Mavis's car and takes her to Sue's flat to confront them both, with Bob arriving there at the same time. Michelle, Bob, Rita, Sue, and Sue's parents have a big argument in the street causing quite a spectacle in front of all the neighbours. Michelle blames the girls for being slutty but Sue retorts that the reason Bob cheats on her is because she doesn't have enough sex with him, which infuriates Michelle even more. After everybody blames each other for the matter, and Bob and Sue's drunken father almost come to blows, Rita's brothers come to rescue her on their motorbikes. Michelle goes home humiliated, ransacks the house, and then leaves Bob for good, taking the children with her.

The next day, Sue goes to Rita's house to walk to school together. Rita tells her that she is no longer going, even though they are due to leave school in two weeks, because she is pregnant with Bob's child. She admits to having seen Bob a few times without Sue and that she is moving in with him now Michelle has left him. When Bob arrives to collect Rita, Sue is enraged and tells them both to get lost.

Sue starts dating Aslam as a rebound to get over Bob. As they grow closer, Sue even brings him to her home. However, her father comes home from the pub drunk and shouts racist abuse at Aslam, causing Sue to leave home and move in with Aslam and his sister.

Some time later, Sue finds out that Rita has suffered a miscarriage and visits her in hospital. On the way out, Bob invites Sue for another sexual escapade, but she rebuffs him. He still gives Sue a lift home, but Aslam sees her getting out of Bob's car and threatens her as he thinks that she was out having sex with Bob.

While Bob and Rita are about to have sex at their house, Bob accidentally calls out Sue's name. This infuriates Rita who assumes Bob is now seeing Sue behind her back. She storms out of the house and goes to confront Sue. When Rita tells Aslam of her suspicions, Aslam violently attacks Sue. Despite everything, Rita comes to Sue's defence and kicks Aslam in the knee and then Sue kicks him in his groin before they both make a hasty escape. They go to Bob's house, where Rita tends to Sue's wounds, but Aslam shows up at the front door. They refuse to let him in but Aslam tries to find a way to break in, all the while trying to convince Sue to come back to him. The situation is interrupted by the arrival of the police, having been called by a neighbour. Aslam then runs off with the police in pursuit.

When Bob returns home, Rita tells him that she is letting Sue move in with them, regardless of Bob's wishes. The two girls then go upstairs, leaving Bob feeling like a guest in his own home. However, when Bob goes upstairs into the bedroom, he finds both girls waiting for him in bed and dives in to join them.

Cast
 Siobhan Finneran as Rita
 Michelle Holmes as Sue
 George Costigan as Bob
 Lesley Sharp as Michelle
 Kulvinder Ghir as Aslam
 Willie Ross and Patti Nichols as Sue's parents
 Danny O'Dea as Paddy
 Maureen Long as Rita's mother
 David Britton, Mark Crampton, Stuart Googwin, Max Jackman, Andrew Krauz and Simon Waring as Rita's brothers
 Joyce Pembroke as Lawnmower Lil
 Jane Atkinson as Helen
 Bryan Heeley as Michael
 Paul Oldham as Lee
 Bernard Wrigley as Teacher
 Dennis Conlon as Taxi Driver
 Black Lace (Alan Barton and Dene Michael) as themselves
 Nancy Pute as Mavis
 Paul Hedges as Hosepipe Harry
 Kailash Patel as Aslam's Sister

Production

Filming locations
Some of the filming locations around West Yorkshire include:
 Buttershaw – Rita's house; Sue's flat; the school; The Beacon pub on Reevy Road West from the very first scene - All of these have now been demolished.
 Baildon – Bob's house (5 Bramham Drive); Moorland scenes.
 Bradford – Aslam's house (Alexandra Street); Luna Radio Kars (Leeds Road).
 Haworth – The school trip to the Brontë Parsonage.
 Woodhead Road recreation ground, between Legrams Lane and Great Horton Road.
 Staveley Garages in Shipley

Critical Reception

The film gained a mostly positive reception from critics.

Writing in The Guardian, film critic Derek Malcolm gave the film a mostly positive review, praising all of the main cast as "excellent", and stated that "Siobhan Finneran and Michelle Holmes play the girls with the kind of authenticity that precludes glamour in favour of guts and garters...". He also praised director Alan Clarke's ability to "energise the whole thing with ace professionalism, just occasionally seeing the funny side of what is essentially a sad story...". He goes on to say that the film avoids sentimentality but lacks something; "[the film] wipes the comfort from the face of a lot of dimly perceived and sloppy notions, but it replaces those notions with nothing."

Roger Ebert of the Chicago Sun-Times gave it 3 out of 4 stars, and having watched it twice noted that some audiences were uneasy at its mixed tone, calling it "angry", "sometimes depressing", and "more interested in human nature than in selling lots of tickets with lots of sex."

References

External links
 
 
 
 
 British Film Institute Screen Online

1987 comedy films
1987 drama films
1980s English-language films
1980s British films
1987 films
1980s coming-of-age comedy-drama films
1980s sex comedy films
Adultery in films
British coming-of-age comedy-drama films
British sex comedy films
Films about threesomes
British films based on plays
Fictional trios
Films based on multiple works
Films directed by Alan Clarke
Films produced by Sanford Lieberson
Films scored by Michael Kamen
Films set in Bradford
Films set in Yorkshire
Films shot in Yorkshire
Juvenile sexuality in films